Mario Molinari (born 21 February 1994), known professionally as Tedua, is an Italian rapper and actor.

Initially also known as Duate, Tedua is known as one of the members of the collective Wild Bandana, along with Izi, Vaz Té, Sangue and Ill Rave.

Biography 
Tedua, pseudonym of Mario Molinari, was born in Genoa. At the age of three he was entrusted to a family, with whom the young Mario stayed for a very short span of time. He later spent a few years with his maternal grandmother in Milan, before returning in his teens in the town of Cogoleto, in the suburbs of Genoa, where he grew up coming into contact with those who will then be members of Wild Bandana. Aged 13 Mario met Vaz Tè at school, through whom he will meet Izi. The three, who will then be joined by other boys, will begin to devote themselves to musical activity, giving themselves soon stage names: Molinari chose Incubo (Nightmare), name which he later dropped in favor of Duate.

Musical style 
The musical style of Tedua approaches essentially to  drill. From this point of view, the critics haven't been unanimous regarding the style of Tedua, expressing sometimes satisfaction, sometimes disapproval of the artistic innovation of the rapper. Drill sounds, however, respond to the flow of consciousness that underlies the music of Tedua, which is always a verbal expression of thoughts and experiences of life.

Tedua has often claimed to have been stylistically inspired by the Italian rapper Dargen D'Amico, from whom he inherited the vision of music as a stream of consciousness: not surprisingly, in the Mowgli disc is contained a piece, Acqua (malpensandoti), whose refrain is a resumption of D'Amico's Malpensandoti.

In addition to the Milanese rapper, Tedua's sources of inspiration include Chief Keef, Fredo Santana and Fedez.

Discography

As a soloist 
Studio album
 2017 – Orange County California
 2018 – Mowgli

Mixtape
 2014 – Medaglia d'Oro 
 2015 – Aspettando Orange County 2016 – Orange County Mixtape 2020 – Vita Vera Mixtape 2020 – Vita Vera Mixtape – Aspettando La Divina CommediaSingles
 2016 – "Pugile"
 2017 – "Bimbi" 
 2017 – "Wasabi 2.0"
 2017 – "La legge del più forte"
 2018 – "Burnout"
 2018 – "Acqua (malpensandoti)"
 2018 – "Fashion Week RMX"
 2018 – "Vertigini"
 2019 – "Elisir"

 With the Wild Bandana 

 2017 – Amici miei 2020 – "Manhattan" (single from Vita Vera Mixtape'')

Collaborations 

 "Cosa non va", Believe Music (with Disme, Tedua & Chris Nolan) 2020
 "Para'", Sony Music Italy (with Bresh & Tedua) 2020
 "Puro Sinaloa", Universal Music Italy (with Tedua, Ernia, Rkomi & Lazza) 2020

References

Italian rappers
1994 births
Musicians from Genoa
Living people